Theresa Lynn Ann Evelyn Ivens (born June 23, 1967) is an American actress and author. She is best known for her roles as Simone Torres in the soap opera All My Children (2001–2007) and Orchid in the digital series The Bay (2012–2020), the latter of which earned her a nomination for the Daytime Emmy Award for Outstanding Supporting Actress in a Digital Daytime Drama Series in 2018.

Personal life
Ivens was born  in Newport Beach, California and raised in Reno, Nevada. She was engaged to baseball first baseman, David Segui, but they broke off the engagement in 2003.  She married Mark Osgood on July 2, 2004, but in 2013, Ivens revealed that she is divorced. Their  daughter, Kiana, was born on October 9, 2004.

Ivens is also a major sports fan. Her favorite teams include the San Francisco 49ers, the Los Angeles Lakers and the San Antonio Spurs. She enjoys skiing, whitewater rafting and golf. Other non-sports related hobbies include creative writing and poetry, photography and arts & crafts.

Career
Her feature film credits include; Jimmy Hollywood with Joe Pesci, Marked for Death with Steven Seagal, and Piranhaconda. Her television credits include roles in The Barefoot Executive, with Jason London, There Was a Little Boy, with Scott Bairstow, and Breast Men. She played Debbie Baxter in the TV series Wake, Rattle, and Roll. She also had guest appearances in Boy Meets World, Coach, Melrose Place, Baywatch, Married... with Children and Highway to Heaven.  She has also done voice work for the classic Lucas Arts adventure game, Grim Fandango, as Lupe.

She released her debut novel, The Buzz: Pointing Fingers, in late 2014.

References

External links
 

1967 births
Living people
American film actresses
American soap opera actresses
American television actresses
American video game actresses
American web series actresses
American women writers
Actresses from Newport Beach, California
Writers from California
20th-century American actresses
21st-century American actresses
20th-century American women writers
21st-century American women writers